KDVW-LP (100.9 FM) is a low-power FM radio station licensed to Montrose, Colorado, United States. The station is currently owned by Calvary Chapel of Montrose.

References

External links
 
 

DVW-LP
Radio stations established in 2008
2008 establishments in Colorado
DVW-LP
Montrose, Colorado
Calvary Chapel Association